St. Fintan's Cemetery is located in Sutton, on the south side of Carrickbrack Road in Dublin, Ireland. It is in several sections: original with a ruined keeper's cottage and the remnants of old St. Fintan's Church, 1889, 1907 and 1954 extensions, and St. Fintan's Lawn Cemetery divided to St. Marnoc's, St. Assam's, St. Barroc's, St. Nessan's a St. Polan's. Just beyond the older portion is the still-flowing, still-visited St. Fintan's Holy Well.

Notable people buried in St. Fintan's cemetery

 Jack Belton, TD, Lord Mayor of Dublin
 Frankie Byrne, Broadcaster
 Gay Byrne, RTÉ radio and TV presenter
 Frank Cahill, Irish nationalist, teacher and politician
 Pádraic Colum and Mary Colum, writers
 Maureen Cusack, actress
 Hilton Edwards, director, buried with Micheál Mac Liammhóir
 Gerald FizGibbon, judge
 Charles Haughey, 7th Taoiseach of Ireland who was buried here following a State funeral
 Patrick Hillery, 6th President of Ireland
 John Hunt, antiquarian
 Mainie Jellett, artist
 Seán Dublin Bay Rockall Loftus, Irish politician, lawyer, and environmentalist
 Phil Lynott, iconic rock musician, formerly of the band Thin Lizzy
 Micheál Mac Liammóir, author and playwright
 Christopher Nolan, author
 Tommy Potts, Irish traditional fiddle player and composer
 Feargal Quinn, founder of Superquinn and Senator
 Tom Stafford, Mayor of Dublin
 William Stokes, physician
 Stardust fire, victims of the nightclub fire in 1981

Commonwealth War Graves Commission
The Commonwealth War Graves Commission registers and maintains two graves of British service officers of World War II, one of the Royal Air Force (in the old ground) and another of the Royal Naval Volunteer Reserve (in the newer extension).

References

External links
 

Sutton, Dublin
Howth
Cemeteries in County Dublin
 
Fintan
Religion in Fingal
Buildings listed on the Fingal Record of Protected Structures